Mayor of the Town is a syndicated American sitcom and drama that aired in 1954.

Premise

Mayor of the Town was based on the radio series of the same name, which ran from 1942 until 1949. In 1954, writer Jean Holloway created a televised version of the radio program. The series, also titled Mayor of the Town, premiered in November 1954.

The series took place in the fictional small American town of Springdale. The series mainly focuses around the mayoral and personal life of Mayor Thomas Russell, (played by Thomas Mitchell). The series co-starred Kathleen Freeman as Mayor Russell's housekeeper, Marilly, and his ward, Butch, was played by David Saber.

Background
Planning for the program began in 1951, calling for Lionel Barrymore to reprise his radio role as the title character. However, production did not begin until 1954, when Barrymore's health prevented him from acting. Mitchell was selected to take Barrymore's place.

Cast

Thomas Mitchell as Mayor Thomas Russell
Kathleen Freeman as Marilly
Jean Byron as Minnie
Tudor Owen as Joe Ainsley

Production and distribution

Rawlins-Grant Productions and Gross-Krasne Films produced the series. UTP was the initial distributor, followed by MCA. All 39 episodes of the series were broadcast in first-run syndication before generally ending in 1955. The Los Angeles market was an exception, as broadcasting of the series there began in 1956 with sponsorship by Richfield Oil.

References

External links

1954 American television series debuts
1955 American television series endings
American comedy-drama television series
CBS original programming
First-run syndicated television programs in the United States